Belushi or Balushi may refer to:
 Belushi (surname)
 Belushi: A Biography, a 2005 biography of John Belushi
Belushi (film), a 2020 documentary film on John Belushi

See also
 Balushi (disambiguation)
 Belisha (disambiguation)
 Berisha (disambiguation)